The John Steinbeck Award: "In The Souls of the People", is an annual award given to an individual or group that has contributed to society in the spirit of John Steinbeck. The award is given to artists who capture "Steinbeck’s empathy, commitment to democratic values, and belief in the dignity of people who by circumstance are pushed to the fringes." The award is presented by the Martha Heasley Cox Center for Steinbeck Studies at San Jose State University, with the sanction of the Steinbeck Estate.

Steinbeck's legacy
The phrase "in the souls of the people" comes from Chapter 25 of The Grapes of Wrath and captures the writer's enduring legacy as an engaged and socially aware artist. From the 1930s on Steinbeck wrote about "the people," his heart open to the longing, loneliness, despair and triumph of those on the edges. Americans were his people, and his last book, America and Americans (1966) expresses his enduring love for a democratic nation. Thomas Steinbeck wrote that the awardee is a "planetary patriot," which means, a person who, in keeping with Maurice Steinbeck's understanding of the highest aspirations of an artist, "stands up against the stones of condemnation, and speaks for those who are given no real voice in the halls of justice, or the halls of government. By doing so these people will naturally become the enemies of the political status quo."

History of the Award
The Steinbeck Award was first presented in 1996 to Bruce Springsteen in a sold-out event at the Event Center of San Jose State University. Ted Cady, the chair of the Martha Heasley Cox Center's award selection committee and former Event Director for the Student Union, has organized all of the Award presentations. John Steinbeck's elder son, Thomas Steinbeck, participated in several of the award ceremonies, including those honoring Sean Penn and Rachel Maddow.

Past recipients
Joan Baez 
Jackson Browne
Ken Burns
Garrison Keillor 
Rachel Maddow
John Mellencamp
Arthur Miller 
Michael Moore
Sean Penn 
John Sayles 
Bruce Springsteen
Studs Terkel 
Khaled Hosseini
Francisco Jiménez (writer)
Bob Woodruff
Mumford & Sons

References

External links
 John Steinbeck Award Official Website

John Steinbeck
San Jose State University
Arts awards in the United States